Israel–Premier Tech is a UCI ProSeries cycling team founded in 2014 by Ron Baron and Ran Margaliot and based in Israel. The team competed as a UCI World Tour squad from 2020 - 2022 before being relegated to the ProSeries at the end of the 2022 season.

History

Israel Cycling Academy (2014–2019) 
In November 2014, Ron Baron and Ran Margaliot launched the Israel Cycling Academy (ICA), with the aim of providing an opportunity for young and talented cyclists to compete in the international arena and launch their professional careers. This team was intended to provide inspiration, hope and faith to future generations of Israelis. The team's first victory came in the fourth stage of the 2015 Tour d'Azerbaïdjan, won by Daniel Turek. On 2 July 2015, the Israeli Road Racing Champion Guy Sagiv joined the ranks of ICA.

In 2018, the team participated in a cycling monument event for the first time – 2018 Milan-San Remo, and in a grand tour for the first time – the 2018 Giro d'Italia. The Giro d’Italia opening stage took place in Jerusalem on 4 May 2018 – the first time in the Giro's 101 years of existence that it has started outside Europe. The Giro held its second and third stages in Israel before it continued onto European soil. The three stages raced in Israel attracted considerable interest from the Israeli public, with many thousands of Israelis lining up along the route and supporting the riders and especially the ICA home team. It was considered a significant success. ICA co-owner Sylvan Adams was the driving force behind the Giro's "Big Start" in Israel, having financed a significant part of the race budget. ICA's best performance in the Giro was recorded in the 18th stage, when its Spanish rider Ruben Plaza finished in second place. Three days later when the team completed the Giro in Rome, Guy Sagiv became the first-ever Israeli cyclist to finish a grand tour.

In 2019, in its fifth season of existence, ICA enlarged its team roster to 30 riders and set up a racing program that has exceeded 250 racing days all around the globe. The team was invited to take part in the Giro d’Italia In May 2019 and will make its first appearance in the Tour of California. The team owners, Ron Baron and Sylvan Adams, have set the team's goal as participation in the world's biggest races including the Tour de France, in order to continue inspiring and developing a new generation of Israeli cyclists. In January 2019 the team opened three cycling special youth programs in Israel and formed a youth cycling team in the Arab village of Shfaram. To further develop young Israeli cyclists, ICA operates a development team with a select group of under-23 riders. They have also established a special partnership with one of the leading French amateur teams – Côte d’Armor – which enables its young development team riders to race in France and gain valuable experience overseas.

Israel Start-Up Nation (2020–2021) 
In October 2019,  completed the takeover of UCI World Tour team Katusha-Alpecin, including its UCI WorldTour license. As a result,  was due to become a UCI World Tour team, pending UCI approval. The UCI approved the team's promotion to World Tour status in December of that year, and the team subsequently changed its name to Israel Start-Up Nation, while the former name became the name of the team's continental level development squad. In July 2020, it was announced that seven-time Grand Tour winner Chris Froome would join the team for the 2021 season.

In August and September 2020,  took part in the 2020 Tour de France. On 11 October 2020, the team won a Grand Tour stage for the first time when British rider Alex Dowsett won Stage 8 of the 2020 Giro d'Italia. They won another Grand Tour stage 11 days later when Irish rider Dan Martin won Stage 3 of the 2020 Vuelta a España, a result that also took him up from third to second in the General classification; he eventually finished fourth in that classification. On 4 December 2020, the team announced Cherie Pridham as a new sports director, the first woman to assume the role on a men's World Tour team.

In the 2021 Giro d'Italia in May, Italian rider Alessandro De Marchi briefly wore the maglia rosa as leader of the general classification after Stages 4 and 5, while Dan Martin won Stage 17 and finished tenth overall, and Davide Cimolai finished second in the Points classification. The team itself finished as one of three teams with no penalty points in the Fair Play classification.

Israel–Premier Tech (since 2022) 
Ahead of the 2022 season, the team announced that Canadian tech company Premier Tech would join as a co-title sponsor.

The season was largely disappointing for IPT, as they struggled for results and faced the threat of relegation from the UCI World Tour. Canadian rider Hugo Houle provided a rare moment of success with his maiden Tour de France and Grand Tour stage victory. An emotional Houle dedicated the win to his late brother.

The team was relegated from the World Tour at the end of the 2022 season after finishing 20th in the points standings for the 2020 - 2022 qualification cycle. The top 18 teams qualified for the 2023 - 2025 cycle, meaning that from 2023 the team will drop down a division and race under a UCI ProTeam licence. Among non-World Tour teams, IPT finished third in the 2022 one-year points list behind Lotto-Soudal and TotalEnergies, meaning it also missed out on wildcards for 2023 World Tour stage races but will receive entries to all World Tour one-day events.

Team roster

Major wins

National champions

2015
 Israel Time Trial, Yoav Bear
 Israel Road Race, Guy Sagiv
2016
 Namibia Road Race, Dan Craven
 Israel Time Trial, Aviv Yechezkel
 Israel Road Race, Guy Sagiv
 Mexico Road Race, Luis Lemus
 Estonia Road Race, Mihkel Raim
2017 
 Israel Time Trial, Guy Sagiv
 Israel Road Race, Roy Goldstein
 Latvian Road Race, Krists Neilands
2018 
 Israel Time Trial, Omer Goldstein
 Israel Road Race, Roy Goldstein
 Latvian Road Race, Krists Neilands
 Estonia Road Race, Mihkel Raim
2019
 Austria Time Trial, Matthias Brändle
 Israel Time Trial, Guy Niv
 Latvian Time Trial, Krists Neilands
 Israel Road Race, Guy Sagiv
2020
 Estonia Road Race, Norman Vahtra
 Austria Time Trial, Matthias Brändle
 Israel Time Trial, Guy Sagiv
 Israel Road Race, Omer Goldstein
2021
 Israel Time Trial, Omer Goldstein
 Austria Time Trial, Matthias Brändle
 Denmark Road Race, Mads Würtz Schmidt
 Canada Road Race, Guillaume Boivin
2022
 Israel Time Trial, Omer Goldstein
 Israel Road Race, Itamar Einhorn

See also
Sports in Israel

References

External links 

 
UCI WorldTeams
Former UCI Professional Continental teams
UCI Continental Teams (Europe)
Cycling teams established in 2015
2015 establishments in Israel